Tourism is an economic contributor to the Kingdom of Thailand. Estimates of tourism revenue directly contributing to the GDP of 12 trillion baht range from one trillion baht (2013) 2.53 trillion baht (2016), the equivalent of 9% to 17.7% of GDP. When including indirect travel and tourism receipts, the 2014 total is estimated to be the equivalent of 19.3% (2.3 trillion baht) of Thailand's GDP.  The actual contribution of tourism to GDP is lower than these percentages because GDP is measured in value added not revenue. The valued added of the Thailand's tourism industry is not known (value added is revenue less purchases of inputs). According to the secretary-general of the Office of the National Economic and Social Development Council in 2019, the government projects that the tourism sector will account for 30% of GDP by 2030, up from 20% in 2019.

Tourism worldwide in 2017 accounted for 10.4% of global GDP and 313 million jobs, or 9.9% of total employment. Most governments view tourism as an easy moneymaker and a shortcut to economic development. Tourism success is measured by the number of visitors.

Prior to the pandemic, Thailand was world’s eighth most visited country as per World Tourism rankings compiled by the United Nations World Tourism Organization. In 2019, Thailand received 39.8 million international tourists, ahead of United Kingdom and Germany.  and received fourth highest international tourism earning at 60.5 billion US dollar. 

The Tourism Authority of Thailand (TAT), a state enterprise under the Ministry of Tourism and Sports, uses the slogan "Amazing Thailand" to promote Thailand internationally. In 2015, this was supplemented by a "Discover Thainess" campaign.

Overview 

Among the reasons for the increase in tourism in the 1960s were the stable political atmosphere and the development of Bangkok as a crossroads of international air transport. The hotel industry and retail industry both expanded rapidly due to tourist demand. It was boosted by the presence of US GIs who arrived in the 1960s for rest and recuperation (R&R) during the Vietnam War. During this time, international tourism was becoming the new trend as living standards increased throughout the world and travel became faster and more dependable with the introduction of new technology in the air transport sector.

Tourist numbers have grown from 336,000 foreign visitors and 54,000 GIs on R&R in 1967 to 32.59 million foreign guests visiting Thailand in 2016. The Tourism Authority of Thailand (TAT) claims that the tourist industry earned 2.52 trillion baht (US$71.4 billion) in 2016, up 11% from 2015. TAT officials said their revenue estimates, for foreign and domestic tourists combined, show that tourism revenue for all of 2017 may surpass earlier forecasts of 2.77 trillion baht (US$78.5 billion).

In 2015, 6.7 million people arrived from ASEAN countries and the number is expected to grow to 8.3 million in 2016, generating 245 billion baht. The largest numbers of Western tourists came from Russia (6.5%), the UK (3.7%), Australia (3.4%) and the US (3.1%). Around 60% of Thailand's tourists are return visitors.

In 2014, 4.6 million Chinese visitors travelled to Thailand. In 2015, Chinese tourists numbered 7.9 million or 27% of all international tourist arrivals, 29.8 million; 8.75 million Chinese tourists visited Thailand in 2016. In 2017, 27% of the tourists that came to Thailand came from China. Thailand relies heavily on Chinese tourists to meet its tourism revenue target of 2.2 trillion baht in 2015 and 2.3 trillion in 2016. However, in 2020, it was reported that Chinese tourists now ranked Thailand as third most popular foreign tourist destination, having been the top previously.

It is estimated that the average Chinese tourist remains in the country for one week and spends 30,000–40,000 baht (US$1,000–1,300) per person, per trip. The average Chinese tourist spends 6,400 baht (US$180) per day—more than the average visitor's 5,690 baht (US$160). According to Thailand's Tourism Authority, the number of Chinese tourists rose by 93% in the first quarter of 2013, an increase that was attributed to the popularity of the Chinese film Lost in Thailand that was filmed in the northern province of Chiang Mai. Chinese media outlets have claimed that Thailand superseded Hong Kong as the top destination for Chinese travellers during the 2013 May Day holiday. In 2013, the Chinese National Tourism Administration published A Guide to Civilized Tourism which has specific statements regarding how to act as a tourist in Thailand.
 
In 2015, Thailand hosted 1.43 million Japanese travellers, up 4.1% from 2015, generating 61.4 billion baht, up 6.3%. In 2016, Thailand expects 1.7 million Japanese tourists, generating 66.2 billion baht in revenue.

TAT estimates that 1.9 million Indian tourists visited in 2019, up 22% from 2018, generating 84 billion baht in revenue, up 27%.

To accommodate foreign visitors, the Thai government established a separate tourism police force with offices in the major tourist areas and its own central emergency telephone number.

Since the opening of the Vietnam, Cambodia, and Laos borders in the late 1900s, competition has increased because Thailand no longer has the monopoly on tourism in Southeast Asia. Destinations like Angkor Wat, Luang Prabang and Halong Bay now rival Thailand's former monopoly in the Indochina region. To counter this, Thailand is targeting niche markets such as golf holidays, holidays combined with medical treatment or visits to military installations. Thailand has also plans to become the hub of Buddhist tourism in the region.

International rankings 
In 2008, Pattaya was 23rd with 4,406,300 visitors, Phuket 31st with 3,344,700 visitors, and Chiang Mai ranked 78th place with 1,604,600 visitors.

In a list released by Instagram that identified the ten most photographed locations worldwide in 2012, Suvarnabhumi Airport and Siam Paragon shopping mall were ranked number one and two respectively, more popular than New York City's Times Square or Paris's Eiffel Tower.

In 2013, Thailand was the 10th "top tourist destination" in the world tourism rankings with 26.5 million international arrivals.

In the MasterCard 2014 and 2015 Global Destination Cities Index, Bangkok  ranked the second of the world's top-20 most-visited cities, trailing only London. The U.S. News' 2017 Best Countries report ranked Thailand at 4th globally for adventure value and 7th for cultural heritage.

The Travel and Tourism Competitiveness Report 2015 published by the World Economic Forum ranked Thailand 35 of 141 nations. Among the metrics used to arrive at the rankings, Thailand scored high on "Natural Resources" (16 of 141 nations) and "Tourist Service Infrastructure" (21 of 141), but low on "Environmental Sustainability" (116 of 141) and "Safety and Security" (132 of 141).

In 2016, Bangkok ranked 1st surpassing London and New York in Euromonitor International's list of "Top City Destinations" with 21 million visitors.

In 2019, Bangkok ranked 1st surpassing Paris and London in Mastercard's list of "Global Destination Cities Index 2019" with 22.78 million visitors. Phuket was 14th with 9.89 million visitors and Pattaya 15th with 9.44 million visitors.

Impact of political unrest 
At the commencement of 2014, the Thai tourist industry suffered due to the political turmoil that erupted in October 2013. A shutdown of Bangkok's governmental offices on 13 January 2014 by anti-government protesters, prompted some tourists to avoid the Thai capital. TAT estimated that arrival numbers might drop by around five percent in the first quarter of 2014, with the total number of arrivals down by 260,000 from the original projection of 29.86 million. Tourism revenue is also expected to drop slightly from 1.44 trillion.

Tourist arrivals in 2014 totalled 24.7 million, a drop of 6.6% from 2013. Revenues derived from tourism amounted to 1.13 trillion baht, down 5.8% from the previous year. Kobkarn Wattanavarangkul, Thailand's Minister of Tourism and Sports, attributed the decline to the political crisis in the first half of 2014 which dissuaded many potential visitors from visiting Thailand. Tourism officials also pointed to the dramatic fall in the value of the Russian ruble which has damaged the economies of popular Russian destinations such as Phuket and Pattaya.

At the beginning of April 2015, Thailand ended martial law, to be replaced by Article 44 of the provisional constitution, granting unrestricted powers to the prime minister. The words "martial law" were toxic to foreign democracies, but, in terms of tourism, even more toxic to foreign travel insurance providers, who decline to provide insurance to those visiting nations under martial law. The tourism industry rebounded swiftly after the lifting of martial law. Deputy Prime Minister Pridiyathorn Devakula said that the arrival of high-spending tourists from Europe and the US is expected to increase.

Statistics

Foreign tourist arrivals in Thailand

Past tourism statistics 
 Reference: statistics for the period 1998–2016, 2017–2018.

In their justifications for constructing a new coal-fired power plant in Krabi Province (2015), the Electricity Generating Authority of Thailand (EGAT) presumes that by 2032 Thailand will receive more than 100 million tourists a year, 40% of them visiting Phuket and neighbouring areas such as Krabi. On average, the power consumption of a tourist is four times higher than that of a local resident.

In 2015 some segments of Thailand's hospitality industry enjoyed their best year in over two decades, according to research firm STR Global. Thailand closed the year with an overall hotel occupancy of 73.4%, an increase of 13.6% over 2014, as arrivals rose to near the 30 million mark, driven by demand from the Chinese market. December 2015 was a particularly strong month as occupancy levels reached 77.4%, the highest level since 1995.

Despite the increasing number of tourist arrivals, some businesses catering to the tourist trade report declining numbers. Mr Sompoch Sukkaew, chief legal counsel of the Patong Entertainment Business Association (PEBA) in Phuket, said in January 2016 that entertainment businesses are suffering. "Over the past three years, most bars were averaging about B90,000 revenue per day at this time of year,...now they're making just B40,000. Small bars...used to average B40,000 to B50,000 a day, now they're down to just B10,000 per day....PEBA members generated about B1.5 million per day during the peak season. Now it's down to about B540,000 per day." PEBA members number 500 in Patong, with about 200 businesses in the Bangla Road entertainment area. PEBA President Weerawit Kuresombat attributed the decline to the rise in Chinese tourism. "...most of them [Chinese tourists] come on complete tour packages....This means they spend very little on extras....They rarely venture out for the nightlife or even visit independent restaurants. They just don't spend much", he said.

The Thai government expects revenue from foreign tourists to increase by 8.5% to 1.78 trillion baht (US$49.8 billion) in 2017. Deputy Prime Minister Thanasak Patimaprakorn attributed the increase to the improving outlook for global tourism as well as Thailand's investments in infrastructure. In 2016, Thailand had 32.6 million visitors, a rise of nearly nine percent from 2015. In 2017 the number of tourists visiting Thailand exceeded 35 million. Thanasak expects daily tourist spending to increase to 5,200 baht per person in 2017, up from 5,100 baht in 2016. Local tourists are expected to contribute an additional 950 billion baht in tourism revenues in 2017.

Sex tourism 

Kobkarn Wattanavrangkul, named Thailand's first female tourism minister in 2014, has pledged to eradicate Thailand's sex industry. "We want Thailand to be about quality tourism. We want the sex industry gone," Ms Kobkarn told Reuters. "Tourists don't come to Thailand for sex. They come here for our beautiful culture." She has named Pattaya, with its thousands of bars, brothels, and massage parlours, her "pilot project" in the cleanup campaign. Kobkarn was replaced as tourism minister in November 2017.

On 21 February 2017, Prime Minister Gen Prayut Chan-o-cha announced that he will order the police to dismantle Pattaya's sex industry. "I don't support prostitution", said Prayut.

Medical tourism

, with 64 accredited hospitals, Thailand is currently among the top 10 medical tourism destinations in the world. In 2017, Thailand registered 3.3 million visits by foreigners seeking specialised medical treatment. In 2018, this number grew to 3.5 million.  Thai medical centres are serving increasing numbers of Chinese medical tourists in tandem with increasing overall Chinese tourism. All numbers reported by the government must be viewed with some skepticism according to the authors of a 2010 study. The Thai government reported that in 2006, 1.2 million medical tourists were treated in Thailand. But the 2010 study of five private hospitals that serve more than 60% of foreign medical tourists concluded that there were 167,000 medical tourists in Thailand in 2010, far below the government estimate. Most came for minor elective (cosmetic) surgery.

Gastronomical tourism 
The governor of the Tourism Authority of Thailand (TAT), said the agency aims to increase income from the gastronomy business from 20% of total tourism income forecasted for 2017 to 25% in 2018. In 2017, TAT aims for 2.77 trillion baht in tourism revenue, 20% of which is projected to come from gastronomy. In 2018, tourism revenue is expected to climb to three trillion baht, with gastronomy accounting for 750 billion baht. Thailand's 103,000 street food vendors alone generated 270 billion baht in revenues in 2017. Suvit Maesincee, Minister of Higher Education, Science, Research and Innovation, expects the Thai street food segment to grow by six to seven percent annually.

TAT, in early-2017, approved a budget of 144 million baht to commission the Michelin Guide to rate restaurants in Thailand for the five-year period 2017–2021. The first guide, Michelin Guide to Bangkok, was released on 6 December 2017. It bestowed Michelin stars on 17 Bangkok restaurants, ten of which do not serve Thai food. Guides to other cities will follow.

In 2016, gastronomy was Thailand's fourth-largest tranche (20%) of tourism income, after accommodation (29%), transport (27%), and shopping and souvenirs (24%). TAT estimates that Chinese tourists spent 83.3 billion baht on food in Thailand in 2016, followed by Russians at 20.8 billion baht, Britons at 18.4 billion baht, Malaysians at 16.1 billion baht, and Americans at 13.9 billion baht.

Elephant tourism 

Elephant trekking has been an attraction for tourists in Thailand for decades. Ever since logging in Thailand was banned in 1989, elephants were brought into camps to put on shows for tourists and to give them rides. The majority of these elephants once used to work in the logging industry. After the government banned logging, many mahouts were then unable to care for their elephants and left them in the wild. After tourism in the country rose, elephants came back into demand. The tourism boom gave elephants a place to work and be cared for. Today there are an estimated 3,000 to 4,000 domesticated elephants in the country.

However, concerns were raised regarding their welfare. Elephants can sustain injuries related to giving rides, or going on treks, with tourists. The elephant's spine is curved and not optimised to carry heavy loads—the weight of two or more tourists at a time. The chairs or benches often used for the tourists to sit on upon it can also cause abrasions and chafing on its back, sides, and torso. During treks mahouts control the elephants with hooks and can use excessive force, resulting in puncture wounds. Common training practices include being chained, cut, stabbed, burned and hit to varying degrees. Inexperienced mahouts are more likely to further harm their elephants and beat them into submission. Hooks are the common tool used to discipline and guide an elephant during treks.

Sport tourism 

Muay Thai is the national sport of Thailand, and a trip to a stadium to witness the 'science of the eight limbs' is an essential experience for many tourists. Studying Muay Thai is a main activity for Thai sport tourism, which the government promotes.

In 2016, there were 11,219 British people, 6,800 Australians, and 5,852 French nationals who visited Thailand to take lessons in the classical martial art. Thirty-eight percent of all people signing up for Muay Thai classes chose Phuket as their study destination, 28% chose Bangkok, and 16% chose Surat Thani.

Tourism authority and initiatives 
In order to reignite growth in Thailand's tourist industry, the Tourism Authority of Thailand (TAT) has embarked on a new campaign for 2015 entitled "2015: Discover Thainess". TAT Governor Thawatchai Arunyik said the campaign will incorporate the "twelve values" that Thai junta leader and Prime Minister Prayut Chan-o-cha wants all Thais to practice. TAT officials foresee a large increase in tourist numbers due to the "Discover Thainess" campaign. Ms Somrudi Chanchai, Director of the TAT Northeastern Office, has forecasted that tourists to her Isan region will increase by 27.9 million [sic] visitors, generating 65 billion baht in revenue.

Safety concerns 
Thailand has problems of ensuring adequate safety for foreign tourists, as there were many cases of murder. The high profile Koh Tao murders in 2014 gained the island the nickname "Death Island".

See also 
Visa policy of Thailand
Tourism in Bangkok
Markets in Bangkok
Responsible Tourism in Thailand
List of shopping malls in Thailand
List of Thai dishes
Banana Pancake Trail
MICE in Thailand

References

External links 

Tourism Authority of Thailand
Thailand Tourism Directory
Tourism Authority of Thailand (TAT)
Ministry of Tourism and Sports
Thailand Now
Thailand Convention & Exhibition Bureau (TCEB)
Thailand Tourism Updates
Department of Tourism

 
 Hotels in Thailand
 
Thailand